The inclusion of steep gradients on railways avoids the expensive engineering works required to produce more gentle gradients. However the maximum feasible gradient is limited by how much of a load the locomotive(s) can haul upwards. Braking when travelling downhill is also a limiting factor. There have been various solutions to hauling rail mounted vehicles up or down inclines. These include simple rail adhesion, rack railways and cable inclines (including rail mounted water tanks to carry barges). To help with braking on the descent, a non-load-bearing "brake rail" located between the running rails can be used, similar to the rail used in the Fell system, e.g. by the Snaefell Mountain Railway on the Isle of Man.

Tramways and light railways often have steeper gradients than heavier railways. This is because all wheels are usually connected to engine power in order to give better acceleration. Grades of 5% are not uncommon on them. Metros and pure commuter railways often also allow steeper gradients, over 4%, for the same reason. High-speed railways commonly allow 2.5% to 4% because the trains must be strong and have many wheels with power to reach very high speeds. For freight trains, gradients should be as gentle as possible, preferably below 1.5%.

Examples 
The list below is of some of the steepest gradients on adhesion railways, in order of decreasing steepness:

See also 

 Grade (slope)
 Hillclimbing (railway)
 Lickey Incline, steepest British main-line gradient
 Longest trains
 Mountain railway
 Rack railways
 Ruling gradient
 Spiral (railway)
 Zig zag (railway)

Further reading

References

External links 
 Sample Curve & Gradient Diagram, Page 5

Adhesion railways, gradients
Steepest gradients